is a railway station on the Himi Line in the city of Takaoka in Toyama Prefecture, Japan, operated by West Japan Railway Company (JR West).

Lines

Station layout
Amaharashi Station consists of two opposed ground-level side platforms, connected by a level crossing. The station is staffed.

Platforms

Adjacent stations

History
Amaharashi Station was opened on April 5, 1912. With the privatization of the JNR on April 1, 1987, the station came under the control of the West Japan Railway Company. A new station building was completed in February 2009.

Passenger statistics
In fiscal 2015, the station was used by an average of 67 passengers daily (boarding passengers only).

Surrounding area

Amaharashi coast
Amaharashi seaside resort
National Route 415

See also
List of railway stations in Japan

References

External links

  

Railway stations in Toyama Prefecture
Stations of West Japan Railway Company
Railway stations in Japan opened in 1912
Himi Line
Takaoka, Toyama